The Communist Party of Uzbekistan, initially known as Communist Party (Bolshevik) of Uzbekistan, was the ruling communist party of the Uzbek SSR, and a part of the Communist Party of the Soviet Union (CPSU). On 14 September 1991, party announced its withdrawal from the CPSU.

First Secretaries

References 

1925 establishments in Uzbekistan
1991 disestablishments in Uzbekistan
Uzbekistan
Communism in Uzbekistan
Communist parties in the Soviet Union
Defunct communist parties
Defunct political parties in Uzbekistan
Defunct socialist parties in Asia
Formerly ruling communist parties
Political parties disestablished in 1991
Political parties established in 1925
Uzbek Soviet Socialist Republic